Opi is a comune and town in the province of L'Aquila in the Abruzzo region of central Italy. It is located in the National Park of Abruzzo, Lazio e Molise.

Main sights
Mother Church of Santa Maria Assunta (mid-12th century)
Church of San Giovanni Battista (late 17th century)
Necropolis of Val Fondillo

References

Cities and towns in Abruzzo
Marsica